KSVH may refer to:

 KSVH-LP, a low-power television station (channel 23) licensed to Victoria, Texas, United States
 Statesville Regional Airport, in Statesville, North Carolina (ICAO code KSVH)